Francis Pierrepont may refer to:

 Francis Pierrepont (died c. 1693) (1662–c. 1693), English politician, Member of Parliament (MP) for Nottingham, 1689–1690
 Francis Pierrepont (Roundhead) (died 1659), English politician, MP for East Retford, 1640, and for Nottingham, 1645–1652